Tarun Shivappa is an Indian producer best known for his Kannada films. Tarun has essayed production of 3 feature films. His latest venture is Victory 2 (sequel to Victory).

Early life 
Tarun Shivappa was born on 1 April 1983 to Shivappa and Susheelamma in Attibele, a town in Bangalore, Karnataka. He graduated with Bachelor of Commerce degree from BTL Degree College & BES College. He is married to Mansa Tarun and is a full-time entrepreneur and producer.

Career 
Tarun broke into spotlight industry as an AD for a TV Channel in 2007. He worked himself into positions of Film Section Head and Programming Head of TV Channels in a span of 5 years. Tarun later launched 9 Thots Media Solutions, his advertising agency and an event management company hosting film award and audio launch functions. He then moved into film production.

Debut Film - Rose 
Tarun started his Production House Tarun Talkies and debuted with Kannada movie Rose in the year 2014 starring Ajay Rao and Shravya in lead roles.

Big Flick - Mass Leader 
Tarun Shivappa is an ardent fan of Century Star Dr. Shivrajkumar. He had pitched the project of Mass Leader in 2014 to Shivrajkumar and also had obtained consent on the venture. Mass Leader had huge star cast including Vijay Raghavendra, Loose Mada Yogi, Gururaj Jaggesh, Ashika Ranganath, Sharmila Mandre and Prakash Belwadi. The mega flick directed by Narasimha and co-produced by Hardik Gowda went into two and half years of pre-production alone and included an 18-day shoot schedule in Kashmir. The film opened in theatres with appreciation from critics and public alike.

Victory 2 - Success 
Tarun teamed up with director Hari Santhosh to produce the sequel to Victory. The name of the sequel was retained and the sequel saw humongous response from the audience. Indian Express wrote "Victory 2 - A sequel that offers four times the entertainment". The film song "Naav Maneg Hogodilla, Namge Baglu Thegiyorilla" by Arjun Janya was a hit and drove crowd to theatres. Victory 2 stands one of the major successes for Sandalwood in 2018 crossing 50 Days.

Tarun is currently producing Chiranjeevi Sarja's next titled Khaki with debutant Naveen Reddy.

Filmography

References

External links
 

Film producers from Bangalore
Kannada film producers
1983 births
Living people